James Brice Beckham (born February 11, 1976) is an American actor most famous for his role as Wesley T. Owens in the television sitcom Mr. Belvedere and for his role as Corey in I Hate My 30's. He lives in Los Angeles and is a member of LA's Namaste theater group.

Early years and education
Born on February 11, 1976 in Long Beach, California, Beckham attended Minnie Gant Elementary School, College Intermediate School, Walter B. Hill Junior High School, and Wilson High School, in Long Beach, California. While in high school, he came in first place in the California High School Speech State Finals in 1993. He attended the University of Southern California, majoring in theater.

Acting career
Beckham began his acting career in school plays. He later went on to do an assortment of radio commercials, and would later appear on an episode of the TV sitcom Alice. He starred in Mr. Belvedere as Wesley T. Owens. The show aired from 1985 to 1990. He appeared in an episode of Win, Lose, or Draw in 1989, and in a guest role in American Dreamer in 1991. In 1992, he starred in an episode of CBS Schoolbreak Special, called "Two Teens and a Baby".

In 2007, he starred in the VH1 series I Hate My 30s. In 2012, Beckham was one of several former child actors who appeared in a Funny or Die video called "CCOKC", which stood for Child Celebrities Opposing Kirk Cameron. A counterpoint to Cameron's stance on homosexuality, the humorous video aimed to spread the message that gay individuals are not a threat to anyone. Keith Coogan, Josie Davis, Jeremy Licht, Kenn Michael, Christine Lakin, and Maureen Flannigan also appeared in the video.

Radio and podcast appearances
Beckham appeared on Ken Reid's TV Guidance Counselor podcast on March 22, 2017.

Filmography

References

External links
 
 

1976 births
Living people
American male child actors
American male television actors
American male stage actors
Male actors from Long Beach, California
20th-century American male actors
21st-century American male actors